Bavent is a commune in the Calvados department in the Normandy region of north-western France.

The inhabitants of the commune are known as Baventais or Baventaises.

Geography
Bavent is located on the northern edge of the Caen plain some 8 km north-east of Caen and 6 km south-west of Cabourg. Access to the commune is by the D513 road from Varaville in the north-east which passes through the commune just north of the village and continues south-west to Hérouvillette. Access to the village is by the D236 which comes from Amfreville in the north-west. The D224 branches from the D513 in the commune and goes west to the village and continues to Goustranville. The D95A goes north from the village to Gonneville-en-Auge while the D95 goes south to Troarn. The D37B branches from the D513 in the west of the commune and goes north to Bréville-les-Monts. Apart from the village there are the hamlets of Chateau de Beneauville, Chef-de-Rue, Les Harnots, Grand Plain, La Ritachere, Le Prieure, La Petite Bruyere, Roncheville, and Robehomme. The commune is mostly farmland except for a large forest in the south.

At 1845 hectares, the commune is the largest in the canton of Cabourg. Its highest point (66 m) is located in the west near a place called La Grande Bruyère. Its lowest point (2 m) is at the exit of the Dives from the commune.

Due to its proximity to the sea, Bavent enjoys an oceanic climate. The nearest weather station is 19 km away at Caen-Carpiquet.

The river Dives forms the south-eastern border of the commune as it flows north-east to join the ocean at Houlgate. The Divette rises in the commune and flows north to join the Dives. The Douet du Moulin du Pre rises in the commune and flows north-east to join the Divette north of Varaville. The Saint-Laurent stream flows from the south through the commune and continues to join the Divette just north of the commune. The Ruisseau du Bois de Bavent forms part of the southern border of the commune.

Toponymy
Bavent is attested in the forms: Bavent in 1059, Badvento in 1063, and Batvent in 1066.

The origin of this place name divides Toponymists:

Dauzat and Rostaing suggest bat vent meaning "a place where the wind blows"
René Lepelley makes a similar hypothesis: that of an old mill whose "sails are blown by the wind". There is fact a mill at Sénoville (Manche), called La Masse de Bavent.
Ernest Nègre proposes an explanation of Bavent from a German anthroponym Badvin.

It is also possible to suggest the Celtic name -ent- Latinized to -entu (m) which is also found in Douvrend (Dovrent in the 12th century) preceded by an unknown element in the absence of an older form. The same suffix has been identified in Nogent (Novientum, from novio meaning "new") and Drevant (Derventum from Dervo meaning "oak", cf. Breton derv also meaning "oak").

The name is homophonic with Bavans (Bavens 11th century, the name of a German man Bavo with the Germanic suffix -ingen Romanized to -ingos).

Robehomme is attested in the forms: Raimberti Hulmus in 1083, Rambertihulmus in 1149, and Robbehomme in 1190.

The first element Robe- comes from the German anthroponym Raimbert. The second element -hommen is widespread in Normandy in this form with the hiatus (the "h" is aspirated): Le Homme (not l'homme cf. Saint-Quentin-sur-le-Homme). This is a toponymic appellative derived from Old Norse holmr meaning "island" or "meadow at the edge of the water". It also took the forms Houlme and Hom. Moreover, there is a hamlet of Hom at Robehomme.

There is also a personal name associated with a Norse appellative topt giving -tot as in Raimbertot at Cauville-sur-Mer (Seine-Maritime).

Bavent appears as Bavent on the 1750 Cassini Map and as Baven on the 1790 version.

Robehomme appears as Robehomme on the 1750 Cassini Map and as Robe homme on the 1790 version.

History

In 1974 the commune of Bavent (984 inhabitants in 1968) merged with Robehomme (122 inhabitants in 1954).

Heraldry

These arms do not respect the Rule of tincture and are therefore faulty.

Administration

List of Successive Mayors

Twinning

Bavent has twinning associations with:
 Geiselbach (Germany) since 1988.
 Stoke Canon (United Kingdom) since 1983.

Demography
In 2017 the commune had 1,814 inhabitants.

Economy
The Terreal Group has a tile production plant in the commune.

The Mesnil pottery of Bavent manufactures finials of Faience. It holds an Enterprise label of living heritage and its expertise is included in the inventory of intangible cultural heritage in France.

Culture and heritage

Civil heritage
The Manoir Venoix (17th century). In 1944 the mansion had significant damage and was renovated in 1948 with some additions and changes.
The Pavilion of Pottery (1842).

The commune has a number of buildings and sites that are registered as historical monuments:
The Chateau of Bavent (17th century)
The Château of Béneauville (1589)
The Château of Béneauville Park The Chateau contains a Clock (16th century) which is registered as an historical object.

Religious heritage
The Church of Saint Hilaire (12th century, much altered in the 19th century).
The Church at Robehomme

Sports
The Bavent Football Club has a soccer team in the district division.

Notable people linked to the commune
 Henri-Gabriel-Marie Le Bègue de Germiny (1811-1900), politician, Mayor of Bavent

See also
Communes of the Calvados department

References

External links
 Bavent official website 

Communes of Calvados (department)